Caro Ramsay is a Scottish writer of crime fiction. Her first ten novels are police procedurals, set in Glasgow, featuring DI Colin Anderson and DS Freddie Costello.

Background
Caro was born in Govan, on Glasgow's south side. A graduate of the British School of Osteopathy, she runs a large osteopath centre in West Scotland, treating animals and humans, and writes in her spare time.

Her first novel Absolution was shortlisted for the CWA New Blood Dagger 2008 and her second Singing to the Dead was longlisted for the Theakston's Old Peculier Crime Novel of the Year Award 2010. The third in the series, Dark Water, was published on 4 August 2010, and the fourth book The Blood of Crows was published on 30 August 2012. Critic Cathi Unsworth in The Guardian opined that Ramsay's series "excels in sense of place, realism, plotting and caustic humour", describing it as "Bleak, black and brilliant".

Ramsay was the subject of a 2007 BBC documentary film, and appeared on STV show The Hour in 2010.

Bibliography
 Absolution (2007)
 Singing to the Dead (2009)
 Dark Water (2010)
 The Blood of Crows  (2012)
 The Night Hunter (2014)
 The Tears of Angels (2015)
 Rat Run (2016)
 Standing Still (2017)
 The Suffering of Strangers (2017)
 The Sideman (2018)
 Mosaic (2019)

Note that Tambourine Girl was the working title of Singing to the Dead, not a separate book.

References

External links
 Official site
 Caro Ramsay interview at Penguin Most Wanted
 Caro Ramsay feature in the Daily Record

Year of birth missing (living people)
Living people
Scottish crime fiction writers
People from Govan
Women mystery writers
Tartan Noir writers